Eidsvik may refer to:

Places
Eidsvik, Vestland, a village in Kvinnherad municipality, Vestland county, Norway
Eidsvik, Møre og Romsdal, a village in Ålesund municipality, Møre og Romsdal county, Norway

Other
Eidsvik Skipsbyggeri, a small shipyard in Kvinnherad municipality, Vestland county, Norway